Last Night on Earth is the tenth studio album by the American alternative rock musician Lee Ranaldo, released on October 7, 2013 on Matador Records. Recorded over a nine-month period at Echo Canyon West in Hoboken, New Jersey, the album features Ranaldo's backing band The Dust which comprises former Sonic Youth bandmate Steve Shelley, guitarist Alan Licht and bassist Tim Lüntzel. In addition to studio recordings, Last Night on Earth incorporates field recordings of Ranaldo in Berlin, Germany and Valeggio sul Mincio, Italy.

Upon its release, Last Night on Earth received positive reviews from music critics and placed in two international charts, Belgium's Ultratop albums chart and the United States' Billboard Heatseekers Albums chart. Last Night on Earth was further promoted by a 32-date international tour.

Release
Last Night on Earth was announced for release on July 22, 2013 by Matador Records alongside upcoming tour dates in the United States and Canada. Further details of the album were published on August 13 and it was described as "a more intense, expansive work" than Ranaldo's previous album Between the Times and the Tides (2012) and "darker in tone & lyrical content than its immediate predecessor." Last Night on Earth was released on October 7 in the United Kingdom and the following day in the United States on various formats, including CD, LP and as a digital download. An alternate mix of the album track "Late Descent #2" was included as a bonus track with iTunes pre-orders of the album.

In promotion of Last Night on Earths release, Lee Ranaldo and the Dust commenced a three-leg, 32-date international tour of North America and Europe. The first leg of the band's North American tour began with a performance at Club Helsinki in Hudson, New York on October 8, 2013 and concluded at The Bellhouse in Brooklyn, New York on October 25. On November 10, the European leg commenced in Groningen, Netherlands and concluded in Tours, France on November 26. The final North American leg, consisting of five dates, began in Portland, Oregon on December 6 and ended with a performance at The Echo in Los Angeles, California on December 13. Lee Ranaldo and the Dust had embarked on an eight-date South American tour three months prior to Last Night on Earths release, which commenced on July 14 in Santiago, Chile and concluded on July 24 in Pompéia, Brazil.

Upon its release, Last Night on Earth placed in record charts in Belgium and the United States. In Belgium, it debuted on Flanders Ultratop albums chart at number 176 and in the United States, the album peaked at number 44 on Billboards Heatseekers Albums chart.

Critical reception

Last Night on Earth received generally positive reviews from critics. At Metacritic, which assigns a normalized rating out of 100 to reviews from mainstream publications, the album received an average score of 68, based on 18 reviews. In a review for Cuepoint, Robert Christgau said the graceful and occasionally beautiful melodies Ranaldo composed for the album would have been subdued by Sonic Youth's noisy aesthetic, while his singing, still somewhat wordier "than even the alt-rock norm, has turned tender, elegiac, lyrical". Writing for AllMusic, Heather Phares summarized that Lee Ranaldo and the Dust "concentrate on expansive songs filled with shimmering melodies and epic solos" and called Last Night on Earth "an album in the old-school sense, with expansive tracks and detours that still add up to a cohesive whole". Uncut deemed the album "ambitious, mature and noisy." Consequence of Sound reviewer Steven Arroyo said the record "features warm, extended guitar pop tracks". Although criticizing the album's length, Arroyo added that it was "a testament that [Ranaldo] can still create something familiar and comforting, while not lowering the songwriting bar. Even when jamming, The Dust remain expertly dense, never too loose, and never too derivative." Paste reviewer Robert Ham was critical of certain compositional elements of the album but praised Alan Licht's guitar work and said "the loose, free spirit of Last Night is to be expected considering how quickly the songs were written and recorded ... and for the most part, it suits Ranaldo. His lyrics are far more discursive and poetic."

In a mixed review, Colin St. John from Pitchfork Media criticized the songs' similarities to Sonic Youth and stated "while [the album] has been billed as more of a cohesive band's vision, it still suffers from a similar blurry schizophrenia." Kevin Korber of PopMatters stated that "Last Night on Earth finds a great songwriter capable of much more retreating to comfortable surroundings". Tiny Mix Tapes critic Jeff Milo took note of how the album's songs "spread, shift, transform, and soar—never too waywardly in a 'jammy' sense, but like a showcase of the splendors of each player's instrumental range and talent", adding it is "a highlight of his aptitude for rich and compelling lyrics".

Track listing

Personnel
All personnel credits adapted from Last Night on Earths album notes.

Lee Ranaldo and the Dust
Lee Ranaldo – vocals, guitar, vibraphone, bells, production, recording
Alan Licht – guitar, bells, backing vocals, production
Tim Lüntzel – bass,
Steve Shelley – drums, shaker, bells, production

Additional musicians
John Medeski – organ, piano, electric piano
Refree – ukulele (5)
Elina Albach – harpsichord (7), recording (7)
Sage Ranaldo – backing vocals (9)

Technical personnel
Ted Young – production, recording, mixing

Technical personnel (continued)
Aaron Mullan – additional recording
Bentley Anderson – additional recording
Elias Gwinn – additional recording
Tim Glasgow – additional recording
Johannes Buff – recording (7)
Greg Calbi – mastering

Design personnel
Ted Lee – artwork, design, paintings
Michael Lavine – photography
Cody Ranaldo – photography, design, technician
Danielle Petrosa – photography

Chart positions

References

External links

2013 albums
Lee Ranaldo albums
Matador Records albums